"I'm Sprung" is the debut single written, produced, and performed by American musician T-Pain from his debut album, Rappa Ternt Sanga (2005). The song is dedicated to his wife, Amber. T-Pain thanked DJ Felli Fel for being the first person to play the song on the radio.

Background
The idea for the song originated from the 1997 movie Sprung.

Chart performance
"I'm Sprung" was a success on the Billboard Hot 100, peaking at number eight, becoming T-Pain's first Top 10 single. The song was in the 2005 and 2006 year-ends, albeit very barely both times. The single was also a success on the R&B charts, peaking at number nine, while peaking at number 14 on the Billboard Pop 100. While a big success in the United States, it was considered a moderate success in most European countries. On June 14, 2006, the single was certified platinum for sales of over a million copies in the United States.

Remix
The official remix of this song was featured on the album as "I'm Sprung Pt. 2", which features Youngbloodz & Trick Daddy. The I'm Sprung remix is with Stat Quo. The U.K. remix features Dizzee Rascal. There is a Swishahouse Chopped & Screwed remix of the song. The most successful version of the song was co-produced by Jason, Armand and Brittany.

A remixed version titled "Jerry Sprunger" was released on 8 November 2019 by Tory Lanez and featured T-Pain.

Music video
Video appearances were made by Midget Mac (who was a contestant on I Love New York 2), Akon, Bone Crusher, Rasheeda, Sleepy Brown and Cyco Black of Crime Mob. At the end of the video for "I'm Sprung", music from "I'm 'n Luv (wit a Stripper)" plays.

Charts

Weekly charts

Year-end charts

Certifications

References

2005 songs
2005 debut singles
T-Pain songs
Song recordings produced by T-Pain
Songs written by T-Pain
Konvict Muzik singles